Xiashan District is a district in the city of Zhanjiang, Guangdong province, China.

References

County-level divisions of Guangdong
Zhanjiang